Syed Muhammad Haseeb Tariq (born 6 April 1996) is a Pakistani swimmer. He participated in the 
2018 Commonwealth Games in Goldcoast and the Olympics 2020 Tokyo Games.

References

Pakistani male swimmers
1996 births
Living people
Olympic swimmers of Pakistan
Swimmers at the 2020 Summer Olympics
Commonwealth Games competitors for Pakistan
Swimmers at the 2018 Commonwealth Games
Swimmers at the 2022 Commonwealth Games
Asian Games competitors for Pakistan
Swimmers at the 2018 Asian Games
South Asian Games bronze medalists for Pakistan
South Asian Games medalists in swimming
20th-century Pakistani people
21st-century Pakistani people